Thomas Clark Oden (1931–2016) was an American Methodist theologian and religious author. He is often regarded as the father of the paleo-orthodox theological movement and is considered to be one of the most influential theologians of the 20th century and the beginning of the 21st century. He was Henry Anson Buttz Professor of Theology and Ethics at Drew University in New Jersey from 1980 until his retirement in 2004. He remained faculty emeritus until his death.

Life
Oden was born on October 21, 1931 in Altus, Oklahoma, the son of an attorney and music teacher. As a youth, he considered two vocations: lawyer or Methodist minister. At age ten, Oden's family moved to Oklahoma City. After the Second World War, Oden returned to Altus and high school where he began his vocation of writing and speaking. Oden earned a BA degree from the University of Oklahoma (1953), a BD from Southern Methodist University (1956), and his MA (1958) and PhD from Yale University (1960). He married Edrita Pokorny on August 10, 1952. They had three children: Clark, Edward, and Laura.

Oden lectured at Yale University, Southern Methodist University, Heidelberg University, Princeton Theological Seminary, Lomonosov University, and the Pontifical Gregorian University, in Rome.

Theology 
Originally a political and theological liberal, he turned to the patristic writings in the early 1970s under the influence of a Jewish colleague, Will Herberg, and discovered what he described as "ecumenical orthodoxy", the interpretation of the New Testament and apostolic doctrine which is universal and accepted. As he wrote in the preface of his Systematic Theology: "My basic goal is to present an orderly view of the faith of the Christian community, on which there has generally been a substantial agreement between the traditions of the East and the West, including Catholicism, Protestantism and Orthodoxy."

Oden became a proponent of paleo-orthodoxy, an approach to theology that often relies on patristic sources. He published a series of books that he said are tools for promoting "classical Christianity". Oden suggested that Christians need to rely upon the wisdom of the historical Church, particularly the early Church, rather than on modern scholarship and theology, which is often, in his view, tainted by political agendas.

Oden said that his mission was "to begin to prepare the postmodern Christian community for its third millennium by returning again to the careful study and respectful following of the central tradition of classical Christianity."

Oden was active in the Confessing Movement in America, particularly within the United Methodist Church, and he served on the board of the Institute on Religion and Democracy. Dean Timothy George of the Beeson Divinity School called Oden "one of the most remarkable Christians of our time [who] has lived through, contributed to and helped overthrow several revolutions."

Oden, had an Arminian theology. His book The Transforming Power of Grace presents one of the best expositions of Arminian theology according to Roger E. Olson. Here are some quotes of The Transforming Power of Grace highlighted by Olson:
“God prepares the will and co-works with the prepared will. Insofar as grace precedes and prepares free will it is called prevenient. Insofar as grace accompanies and enables human willing to work with divine willing, it is called cooperating grace.” “Only when sinners are assisted by prevenient grace can they begin to yield their hearts to cooperation with subsequent forms of grace.” “The need for grace to prevene is great, for it was precisely when ‘you were dead in your transgressions and sins’ (Eph. 2:1) that ‘by grace you have been saved’ (eph. 2:8).”
Olson notes that "By all accounts an orthodox, biblically serious, and evangelical theologian, Oden winsomely and biblically articulates the theology [...] that I call evangelical synergism [or Arminian soteriology]."

Death 
He died on December 8, 2016, at the age of 85. Timothy George wrote in a tribute article after his death:
Few theologians of the past 100 years can claim to have had tea and cookies with Rudolf Bultmann, discussed theology with Karl Barth at his hospital bed in Basel, had lunch with Joseph Cardinal Ratzinger, had an audience with Pope John Paul II, driven through Galilee in a Fiat with Avery Dulles in the passenger seat, and conferred with Coptic and Pentecostal theologians in Africa. Oden did all of these and much more. Along the way, he was both scorned and lionized, and he bore scars from some of the scrapes he was in.

Works
Oden wrote and edited many books, articles, essays, and speeches on a wide range of topics. The following list is limited to books.
 The Crisis of the World and the Word of God, 1962
 Radical Obedience: The Ethics of Rudolf Bultmann, 1964
 The Community of Celebration, 1964
 Kerygma and Counseling, 1966
 Contemporary Theology and Psychotherapy, 1967
 The Structure of Awareness, 1969,1978 (Standard Book #:687-40075-9) The Promise of Barth, 1969
 Beyond Revolution, 1970     
 The Intensive Group Experience, 1972
 After Therapy What?, 1974
 Game Free: the Meaning of Intimacy, 1974
 Should Treatment Be Terminated?, 1976
 TAG: The Transanctional Game, 1976
 Parables of Kierkegaard, 1978  
 Agenda for Theology, 1979, rpt as After Modernity...What?, 1992
 Guilt Free, 1980
 Pastoral Theology: Essentials of Ministry, 1983
 
 Conscience and Dividends, 1985
 
 
 
 
 Crisis Ministries, was Vol 1 Classical Pastoral Care Series, 1986, rpt as Vol 4, 1994
 Becoming a Minister, Vol 1 Classical Pastoral Care Series, 1986, 1994
 The Living God, Systematic Theology, Vol 1, 1987, 1992 
 Doctrinal Standards in the Wesleyan Tradition, 1988, rev 2008
 Phoebe Palmer: Selected Writings, 1988
 Ministry Through Word and Sacrament, Vol 4 Classical Pastoral Care Series, 1988, rpt 1994
 The Word of Life Systematic Theology, Vol 2, 1989, rpt 1992, 1998 
 First and Second Timothy and Titus: Interpretation, 1989, rpt 2012 
 Pastoral Counsel, Vol 3 Classical Pastoral Care Series, 1989, rpt 1994 
 Life in the Spirit, Systematic Theology, Vol 3, 1992 rpt 1994,1998 
 Two Worlds: Notes on the Death of Modernity in America and Russia, 1992
 
 The Transforming Power of Grace, 1993
 
 Corrective Love: The Power of Communion Discipline, 1995
 Requiem: A Lament in Three Movements, 1995
 The Justification Reader, 2002
 The Rebirth of Orthodoxy: Signs of New Life in Christianity, 2003
 One Faith: The Evangelical Consensus (written with J. I. Packer), 2004
 The Humor of Kierkegaard: An Anthology, 2004
 Turning Around the Mainline: How Renewal Movements Are Changing the Church, 2006
 How Africa Shaped the Christian Mind, 2007, pb 2010
 Good Works Reader, Classic Christian Reader Series, 2007
 Classic Christianity: A Systematic Theology, 2009
 In Search of Solitude: Living the Classic Christian Hours of Prayer, 2010
 The African Memory of Mark: Reassessing Early Church Tradition, 2011
 Early Libyan Christianity, 2011
 
 
 
 
 
 , that Oden describes as a multi-volume patristic commentary on Scripture by the “fathers of the church” spanning “the era from Clement of Rome (fl. c. 95) to John of Damascus (c.645-c.749).”In the Wesleyan Theological Heritage, edited with help from Leicester R. Longden 

 Essays in honor of Oden Ancient & Postmodern Christianity: Paleo-Orthodoxy in the 21st Century, Essays In Honor of Thomas C. Oden'', Christopher Hall and Kenneth Tanner, eds, 2002

Notes and references

Citations

Sources

External links

1931 births
2016 deaths
20th-century Protestant theologians
American Christian theologians
American evangelicals
American United Methodist clergy
Arminian theologians
Asbury University alumni
Drew University faculty
Methodist theologians
Methodist writers
People from Altus, Oklahoma
Systematic theologians
Writers from Oklahoma